Mae Charim is a district (amphoe) in the eastern part of Nan province, northern Thailand.

History
Mae Charim was originally known as Bowa (บ่อว้า). The minor district (king amphoe) Mae Charim was established on 1 October 1969 with the three tambons Phong, Nong Daeng, and Mo Mueang split off from Mueang Nan district. It was upgraded to a full district on 12 April 1977.

Geography
Neighboring districts are,clockwise from the southwest, Wiang Sa, Phu Phiang, Santi Suk, and Bo Kluea of Nan Province. To the east is the Xaignabouli province of Laos.

The district is in the Luang Prabang Range mountain area of the Thai highlands.

Administration
The district is divided into five sub-districts (tambons), which are further subdivided into 38 villages (mubans). Nong Daeng is a township (thesaban tambon) covering parts of the tambon Nong Daeng and Mo Mueang. There are a further four tambon administrative organizations (TAO).

The missing number 1 refers to tambon Phong which is now part of Santi Suk District.

References

External links
amphoe.com

Mae Charim